The Battle of Ghedi was the final engagement in the long conflict between the Republic of Venice and the Duchy of Milan which lasted between the years 1425 and 1454 (the year in which the Peace of Lodi was signed).

This battle took place on 15 August 1453 near the Lombard town of Ghedi. The clash allowed the Duchy of Milan to recover all of its territory which had until then been conquered by the Venetians, with the exception of the cities Brescia, Bergamo, and Crema. The battle resulted in the deaths of many Venetians and, as a result of the defeat the Serenisima Republica removed Jacopo Piccinino from command of its armies. The Treaty of Lodi was signed the next year in April. In order to secure his lands and avoid further conflict with Milan Piccinino married Drusiana Sforza, the illegitimate daughter of the Milanese Duke Francesco Sforza in 1464.

Note 

Ghedi
Ghedi
Ghedi
Battles in Lombardy
1453 in Europe